Keyboard may refer to:

Text input
 Keyboard, part of a typewriter 
 Computer keyboard
 Keyboard layout, the software control of computer keyboards and  their mapping
 Keyboard technology, computer keyboard hardware and firmware

Music
 Musical keyboard, a set of adjacent keys or levers used to play a musical instrument
 Manual (music), a keyboard played with hands, as opposed to;
 Pedalboard or pedal keyboard, played with feet
 Enharmonic keyboard, one of several layouts that incorporate more than 12 tones per octave
 Keyboard instrument, a musical instrument played using a keyboard
 Synthesizer, an electronic keyboard
 Electronic keyboard, a synthesizer
 Keyboard percussion instrument, a family of pitched percussion instruments arranged in the layout of a keyboard

Publications 

 Keyboard (magazine), a magazine dedicated to keyboard instruments and  digital music

See also
 Input method
 Keypad